The Henry Lawson High School (abbreviated as THLHS) is a government-funded co-educational comprehensive secondary day school, located in Grenfell, a town in the Central West region of New South Wales, Australia.

Established in 1965, the school enrolled approximately 160 students in 2018, from Year 7 to Year 12, of whom five percent identified as Indigenous Australians and four percent were from a language background other than English. The school is operated by the NSW Department of Education; the principal is Aaron Flagg.

Overview 
The high school was founded on 3 February 1965 after the Grenfell Intermediate School, founded in 1930, separated into Grenfell Public School and THLHS. The school was named in honour of Henry Lawson, a famous Australian poet. The school's motto is "Challenge, Encourage, Achieve".

The school was successful in the Young Achievement Australia awards in 1998 and 1999. In 2003, it was reported that the subject of chemistry would no longer be taught at the school for students preparing for the NSW Higher School Certificate.

See also 

 List of government schools in New South Wales
 Education in Australia

References

External links 
 
 NSW Department of Education and Training: The Henry Lawson High School
 Community web page about the school
 NSW Schools website

Educational institutions established in 1965
Grenfell, New South Wales
Public high schools in New South Wales
1965 establishments in Australia